KRO, or  (Catholic Radio Broadcasting), was a Dutch public broadcasting organization founded on 23 April 1925.

Broadly Catholic in its spiritual outlook, KRO broadcast the bulk of its television output on the NPO 1 channel. KRO published the magazines Studio KRO Magazine and Mikro gids.

(English: "Nameless Orchestra") was the KRO's official orchestra during the pillarization of Dutch society. Their 1952 song "" is a Dutch evergreen, which sold 25,000 copies.

Programmes

Television

Many Dutch farmers remain single because they find it hard to find a woman who is willing to put up with the long hours, hard work, and lack of holidays which farming life requires. This show, which aims to remedy that situation, was KRO's highest-rated television programme in 2008, achieving an average weekly viewership of 4.5 million.

Another KRO speciality is the broadcasting of detective series in the strand KRO Detectives, which mainly focuses on British and Scandinavian productions.

Youth output

KRO  also has some programmes available live across the Netherlands via Omroep NL's digital service, Zappelin / Zapp 24. Some of this output can also be viewed outside the Netherlands via 's "Video Juke Box" service.

See also
Catholic television
Catholic television channels
Catholic television networks

Notes

External links

Official website

Dutch public broadcasting organisations
Netherlands Public Broadcasting
Catholic television networks
Dutch-language television networks
Radio stations established in 1925
Television channels and stations established in 1955
Dutch companies established in 1925